The Names of Love is a 2010 French romantic comedy film directed by Michel Leclerc, written by Leclerc and Baya Kasmi, and produced by Antoine Rein, Fabrice Goldstein and Caroline Adrian. The film recorded 764,821 admissions in Europe.

The film was awarded two César Awards in 2011, including Best Actress for Sara Forestier and Best Original Screenplay.

Plot
The film is semi-biographical, documenting the life of a young woman who uses sex as a weapon to influence right-wing individuals and conservative Muslims. Bahia Benmahmoud (Sara Forestier), a scatter-brained, free-spirited, young left-wing activist, sleeps with her political opposites in order to manipulate them to her cause, until she finds her match in Arthur Martin (Jacques Gamblin).

Cast
 Jacques Gamblin as Arthur Martin
 Sara Forestier as Bahia Benmahmoud
 Zinedine Soualem as Mohamed Benmahmoud
 Carole Franck as Cécile Delivet Benmahmoud
 Jacques Boudet as Lucien Martin
 Michèle Moretti as Annette Martin
 Zakariya Gouram as Hassan Hassini
 Antoine Michel as photographer

The former French Prime Minister Lionel Jospin makes a cameo appearance.

Production
In the scene one in which Sara Forestier walks naked (with only her boots on) through the streets and subway, most of the people she encounters were unaware that a movie was being shot.

Reception
The Names of Love received generally positive reviews. Rotten Tomatoes gives the film an aggregate score of 72%, based on 53 reviews, with an average rating of 6.7/10. The film also has a score of 62 out of 100 on Metacritic based on 19 reviews.

References

External links

2010 films
2010s sex comedy films
César Award winners
French sex comedy films
2010s French-language films
French romantic comedy films
Films directed by Michel Leclerc
2010 romantic comedy films
Films featuring a Best Actress César Award-winning performance
2010s French films